T in the Park 2002 was held on 13–14 July 2002.

Line up
The 2002 line-up was as follows:

Main Stage

BBC Radio 1/NME Stage

King Tuts Wah Wah Tent

Slam Tent

T Break Tent

Links

References

2002 in Scotland
2002 in British music
T in the Park
July 2002 events in the United Kingdom
2002 music festivals